Day is a novel by A. L. Kennedy. It won the novel category and the overall Costa Book of the Year Award in the 2007 Costa Book Awards. The novel is about a man who was a tailgunner in a Lancaster bomber aircraft during World War II. Later, he is an extra in a film about prisoners of war.

Footnotes

2007 British novels
Aviation novels
Costa Book Award-winning works
Jonathan Cape books
Novels set during World War II